Davóne Tines is an American operatic bass-baritone, known for creating roles in new works and for his collaborations with director Peter Sellars.

Education 
Raised in Orlean, Virginia, Tines sang with the First Providence Baptist Church choir there, played violin, and attended Fauquier High School in Warrenton, Virginia from 2001 to 2005. He earned a Bachelor's degree in sociology at Harvard University. Following undergraduate studies, Tines was an intern at the American Repertory Theatre, in Cambridge, Massachusetts. He then worked as production manager for the opera program at George Mason University, where he took voice lessons. He sang in the choir at the Basilica of the National Shrine of the Immaculate Conception. From 2011 to 2013, studied voice for a Master's Degree at the Juilliard School.

Career 
Tines came to international attention starring opposite Philippe Jaroussky in the Dutch National Opera premiere of Kaija Saariaho's opera Only the Sound Remains. He originated leading roles in the world premieres of operas including Matthew Aucoin's Crossing, John Adams' Girls of the Golden West, and Terence Blanchard's Fire Shut Up in My Bones. He co-created and starred in The Black Clown, a dramatic work adapted from the poem of the same name by Langston Hughes. In 2020, he created and co-composed VIGIL, a music video about Breonna Taylor that premiered on the Lincoln Center website and received its orchestral premiere by the Louisville Orchestra.

Honors 
Tines received the 2018 Lincoln Center Emerging Artist Award and was named a 2019 Time Next Generation Leader. In 2020, he received a Sphinx Medal of Excellence and was a National Education Association Human & Civil Rights Awards Honoree.

References 

American operatic bass-baritones
Juilliard School alumni
Harvard College alumni
Year of birth missing (living people)
Living people
People from Fauquier County, Virginia